Herbert Mendelson McGirr (5 November 1891, in Wellington – 14 April 1964, in Nelson) was a New Zealand cricketer who played in two Tests in 1930.

His father William McGirr played 14 matches for Wellington as an opening bowler from 1883–84 to 1889–90, taking 46 wickets at 11.80.

Domestic career
An all-rounder, McGirr played first-class cricket for Wellington from 1913–14 to 1932–33. He was a middle or lower order batsman who hit the ball hard and a steady medium-paced bowler.

He toured England with the New Zealand cricket team under Tom Lowry in 1927, and scored more than 700 runs and took 49 wickets. No Tests were played on that tour.

His best bowling figures (innings and match) came against Canterbury in 1921–22, when he took 7 for 45 and 3 for 47; he also top-scored in Wellington's first innings. He hit his highest score, 141, against Otago in 1930–31, then scored 101 in the next match, against Canterbury.

International career
In the 1929–30 season, when the MCC side under Harold Gilligan played the first Tests against New Zealand, McGirr played in only the third and fourth Tests, both at Eden Park, Auckland. The third Test was ruined by rain; McGirr did not bat and, opening the bowling, took no wickets. The fourth, arranged hastily to compensate for the washout, fared little better in terms of weather, but McGirr scored a half-century and took his only Test wicket, that of Stan Nichols.

He holds the Test match record for the fewest runs (51) in a complete career to include a half-century. He also holds the record as the oldest New Zealand player to make his Test debut: 38 years and 101 days.

Late career
Despite suffering severely from varicose veins for much of his career, "he was always looking at his captain and waiting to be given the ball because he always felt he could take a wicket". "The day was never too hot, nor the score too high, for Herb McGirr to want to bowl."

He was later the cricket coach at Nelson College. McGirr's obituary in Wisden in 1965 records that he played club cricket until he was 67, and gave up then only because "he slipped when taking in the milk" the day after scoring 70.

References

External links
 Herb McGirr at Cricket Archive
 Herb McGirr at Cricinfo

1891 births
1964 deaths
New Zealand Test cricketers
Pre-1930 New Zealand representative cricketers
New Zealand cricketers
Wellington cricketers